Seaton Carew is a railway station on the Durham Coast Line, which runs between Newcastle and Middlesbrough via Hartlepool. It is owned by Network Rail and managed by Northern Trains.

Facilities

The station is unmanned and has no permanent buildings (the old NER buildings on the southbound side were demolished back in the 1970s).  As with other stations on this line, new fully lit waiting shelters, digital information screens and CCTV cameras have been installed (the former replacing the old brick structures), whilst the long-line Public Address system (PA) has been renewed and upgraded with pre-recorded train announcements (running information can also be obtained by telephone and timetable poster boards).  Tickets can only be bought on board the train (or prior to travel), as there is no ticket provision of any kind here.  Two Harrington Humps have been installed at the station to raise platform heights at specific points on the platforms and so improve access to trains.  Step-free access is also available to each platform via ramps from the nearby road.

In 2009 the station underwent maintenance work to re-develop the station and its looks. The station has already seen the cutting down of trees to allow more natural light.

Services 

As of the May 2021 timetable change, the station is served by an hourly service between Newcastle and Middlesbrough. Most trains continue to Hexham (or Carlisle on Sunday) and Nunthorpe. Two trains per day (three on Sunday) continue to Whitby. Two trains operate between Hartlepool and Darlington on Sunday. All services are operated by Northern Trains.

Rolling stock used: Class 156 Super Sprinter and Class 158 Express Sprinter

References

External links 
 
 

Railway stations in the Borough of Hartlepool
DfT Category F2 stations
Former North Eastern Railway (UK) stations
Railway stations in Great Britain opened in 1841
Northern franchise railway stations